Naphat Siangsomboon (: born on May 5, 1996) is a Thai actor and model. He made his first on-screen appearance in Nivea For Men TV commercial, and came to public attention in King Power commercial. His debut drama is Rak Kan Panlawan (2015).

Personal life
Naphat is the son of Pimpaka Siangsomboon, Thai actress and the second runner-up of Miss Thailand World 1988.

He graduated from Bromsgrove International School and Communication Design at Mahidol University International College, also known as MUIC.

Filmography

Television dramas

Film

Television series

Music video appearance

Endorsements

Discography

MC
 Online 
 2020 : Hello Nine Naphat EP1 On Air YouTube:Naphat Siangsomboon (5 พ.ค. 2020)

Awards and nominations

References

External links
 
 

1996 births
Living people
Naphat Siangsomboon
Naphat Siangsomboon
Naphat Siangsomboon
Naphat Siangsomboon
Naphat Siangsomboon
Naphat Siangsomboon
Naphat Siangsomboon
Naphat Siangsomboon
Naphat Siangsomboon